"The Nearness of You" is a popular song written in 1937 by Hoagy Carmichael with lyrics by Ned Washington. Intended for an unproduced Paramount film titled Romance In The Rough, the studio's publishing division Famous Music reregistered and published the song in 1940. It was first recorded by Chick Bullock and his Orchestra on Vocalion. Despite numerous accounts to the contrary, the song was never scheduled for and does not appear in the 1938 Paramount film Romance in the Dark.

It is also heard in the 1940 recording In the Mood by Glenn Miller and His Orchestra, with vocals by Ray Eberle, and by many others.

The song is on the Grammy-Award-winning album Come Away with Me by Norah Jones, at Track 14.

Lyrics
It's not the pale moon that excites me
That thrills and delights me, oh no
It's just the nearness of you

It isn't your sweet conversation
That brings this sensation, oh no
It's just the nearness of you

When you're in my arms and I feel you so close to me
All my wildest dreams come true

I need no soft lights to enchant me
If you'll only grant me the right
To hold you ever so tight
And to feel in the night the nearness of you

Covers
The first big-selling version was recorded on April 28, 1940, by the Glenn Miller Orchestra, with a vocal by Ray Eberle (Bluebird). This recording first reached the Billboard Best Seller chart on July 20, 1940, and lasted eight weeks on the chart, peaking at No. 5.

Other popular versions around that time were recorded by Kay Kyser's orchestra (vocal: Harry Babbitt, Columbia catalog number 35488), by Dinah Shore with Paul Weston's orchestra (Bluebird), and by Eddy Howard with Lou Adrian's orchestra (Columbia).

In 1953, Bob Manning reached No. 16 on the pop charts with this song

The 1956 Ella Fitzgerald and Louis Armstrong album of duets, Ella & Louis, included a version of this song with Fitzgerald soloing vocally while Armstrong soloed both vocally and on trumpet. Accompaniment was provided by the small combo of the Oscar Peterson Trio featuring Peterson on piano, Ray Brown on bass, and Herb Ellis on guitar, joined by Buddy Rich on drums. The album reached No. 1 on the Billboard magazine jazz chart and the top 10 of its pop chart.

German musician Marc Secara recorded the song with the Berlin Jazz Orchestra for the album You're Everything (2008). This was arranged for big band by Steve Gray.

Other versions
 Al Jarreau on his 2004 album, Accentuate The Positive
 Annie Lennox on Nostalgia (Island Records) 2014
 Barbra Streisand on her 1967 album Simply Streisand
 Bill Doggett (1970 King) with "Moon Dust"
 Bill Doggett with "Honey" (King), 1954
 Bing Crosby recorded in 1954 for his radio show
 Bob Manning (Capitol), Australian Capitol, UK Capitol (1953)
 Charlie Parker with the Woody Herman Orchestra – 1951
 Chick Bullock with Fools Rush In (recorded April 26, 1940, Vocalion)
 Connee Boswell with "Blueberry Hill" (Decca)
 Cy Coleman with "You Call It Madness" (MGM) 
 Della Reese on An Evening with Della Reese, 1958
 Dinah Shore (recorded June 25, 1940, Bluebird) with "Maybe"
 Eddy Howard with "Fools Fall in Love" (Columbia)
 Ella Fitzgerald on her 1989 Pablo Records release All that Jazz
 Etta James (album Time After Time)
 Frank Sinatra in 1947, then during the Nice 'n' Easy (1960) sessions
 George Shearing and Nancy Wilson – The Swingin's Mutual (1960)
 Gerry Mulligan – Pleyel Jazz Concert Vol. 1 (1954)
 Glenn Miller – 1940
 Guy Lombardo (Decca) with "Blue Lovebird"
 Harry James (recorded May 1940, Varsity) with "Mister Meadowlark"
 Hash Brown (Philips, 1963) with "I Got My Job Through The New York Times"
 James Taylor on American Standard (2020)
 Jo Stafford for her 1956 album Ski Trails with Paul Weston and His Orchestra
 Joe Pass on Virtuoso No. 4 (1983, recorded in 1973)
 Johnny Hartman - For Trane (Blue Note, 1995) (rec. 1972)
 Johnny Hodges – Wings and Things (1964)
 Joni James (MGM, 1956) with "Let There Be Love"
 Joshua Redman and Brad Mehldau on Nearness (2016)
 Kandace Springs on her 2020 album The Women Who Raised Me.
 Kay Kyser (recorded April 30, 1940, Columbia) with "Blue Lovebird"
 Keely Smith on her 1959 album Swingin' Pretty with Nelson Riddle and His Orchestra
 Kuh Ledesma
 Larry Clinton (Victor, 1940) 
 Leon Merian - 1957
 Little Jimmy Scott on his 2017 album I Go Back Home (feat. Joe Pesci)
 Lou Donaldson with "Mack the Knife" (Blue Note)
 Louis Armstrong with Ella Fitzgerald – Ella and Louis
 Marie Knight (Diamond, 1963) and Apex both with "Walk Away"
 Mat Mathews Quintet (released 1952 by Brunswick) with "Bag's Groove"
 Michael Brecker and James Taylor with Herbie Hancock – Nearness of You (2000)
 Norah Jones ended her 2002 album Come Away with Me with this song.
 Pat Boone
 RJ Jacinto on his 2017 album, Songs I Grew Up With
 Reinhold Svensson (Discovery, 1950) with "Strike Up the Band"
 Rick Nelson on his 1963 album Ricky Nelson sings "For You"
 Sammy Davis Jr. with "Mad Ball" (Brunswick, 1957) 
 Sarah Vaughan – 1949
 Seal on his 2017 album, Seal Standards
 Sheena Easton for her 1993 album No Strings and the OST for Indecent Proposal
 Steve Turre with James Carter and Mulgrew Miller – TNT (2000)
 Tab Smith (Checker) and Quality both with "Because of You"
 The Flamingos (1965 Philips) with "Don't Cheat On Me"
 The Roommates (1963, Philips) with "Don't Cheat On Me"
 Three Sounds with "One for Renee" (Blue Note)
 Vic West (Planet, 1957) with "This Love of Mine"
 Warne Marsh – A Ballad Album (1983)
 Will Downing & Gerald Albright from their 1998 album, Pleasures of the Night
 Willie Nelson on his American Classic album (2009)
 Woody Herman with "Johannesburg" (recorded June 25, 1950, Capitol)

See also
List of 1930s jazz standards

References

Songs with music by Hoagy Carmichael
Songs with lyrics by Ned Washington
1938 songs
Pop standards
Glenn Miller songs
Jo Stafford songs
Shirley Bassey songs
1930s jazz standards
Jazz compositions in F major
Bluebird Records singles